Tatlarin Dam is a dam in Turkey. The development was backed by the Turkish State Hydraulic Works.

See also
List of dams and reservoirs in Turkey

References
DSI directory, State Hydraulic Works (Turkey)

Dams in Nevşehir Province